Matt Crowley (June 20, 1905 – March 7, 1983) was an American film, television and radio actor.

Life and career 
Matt Crowley was born in New Haven, Connecticut. He was a student of George Pierce Baker at Yale University.

As an actor, Crowley had a career in radio before he moved into films, where he was best known for his roles in The Mob (1951), The Edge of Night (1956), and April Love (1957).

He died on March 7, 1983, in Clearwater, Florida, US.

Work

Partial filmography 
The Mob (1951)
The Edge of Night (1956)
April Love (1957)

Television 
Naked City (1958–63)
Car 54, Where Are You?

Radio 
Buck Rogers in the 25th Century in the title role 
Pretty Kitty Kelly as narrator (1940s)
Casey, Crime Photographer as Jack Casey (1930s-50s)
Dick Tracy as Dick Tracy
John's Other Wife as John Perry. (1936–42)
Jungle Jim as Jungle Jim Bradley (1935–38)
Keeping Up with Wigglesworth as the announcer (1945)
Mark Trail as Mark Trail (1950–53)
Myrt and Marge as Anthony Link (1931–47)
The Adventures of Superman as Batman and Inspector Henderson (1940–51)
Perry Mason as Paul Drake (1943–55)
Pretty Kitty Kelly as announcer and narrator (1937–46)
The Road of Life as Dr. Jim Brent (1937–59)

References 

1905 births
1983 deaths
American male film actors
American male stage actors
American male radio actors
American male voice actors
Male actors from New Haven, Connecticut
20th-century American male actors